Alikianos is the head village of the Mousouroi municipal unit in Chania regional unit, Crete located approximately 12.5 kilometers southwest of Chania. Alikianos is best known outside the island for the fierce fighting which took place there during the 1941 Battle of Crete, during which the 8th Greek Regiment (Provisional) aided by the local population, helped cover the retreat of the 10th New Zealand Division, to which it was attached. In retribution, the German paratroopers executed many civilians from Alikianos and the nearby villages.

See also
Alikianos executions

External links
Information & photo

Populated places in Chania (regional unit)